Chamayam may refer to:

 Chamayam (1981 film), a Malayalam-language film directed by Sathyan Anthikkad, starring Kamalahasan and Ambika
 Chamayam (1993 film), a Malayalam-language film directed by Bharathan, starring Manoj K Jayan and Sithara